Brigitte Neveux is a French politician and a member of the far-right FN.

In the 2004 regional elections, she led the FN list in Brittany and obtained 8.47% of the votes in the first round, below the 10% threshold for a place in the runoff. Therefore, no members of the FN were elected to the Regional Council of Brittany.

In 2009, the FN selected Neveux to head the FN list in the West France constituency for the 2009 European elections. Her list gained 3.06% of the vote, not enough to elect a member to the European Parliament.

In 2009, she was selected to be the National Front's top candidate in the Pays de la Loire region for the 2010 regional elections.

In the 2015 regional elections, she was on the list in the Pays de la Loire region for the National Front and elected.

References

Living people
National Rally (France) politicians
Year of birth missing (living people)
Place of birth missing (living people)